USS Chimango is a name used more than once by the U.S. Navy:

 , a coastal minesweeper commissioned 3 June 1941
 , originally LCI(L)-703; renamed and reclassified 7 March 1952

References 

United States Navy ship names